Applecross Senior High School is a public co-educational high school, located in Ardross, a southern suburb of Perth, Western Australia.

Founded in 1958, Applecross Senior High School has traditionally been one of the leading public high schools in Western Australia and consistently ranks academically within the top ten secondary schools in the state. Applecross has produced two Rhodes Scholars.

Applecross runs dedicated art, tennis and chess programs, and has traditionally been dominant in these areas. It also runs Academic Extension classes, for those students talented in the areas of English, Maths, Science, Society and Environment, French and Japanese.

Like many WA high schools, Applecross is a partially selective high school with out-of-area students accepted on a number of criteria.

History 
The school was opened in 1958 to service the rapidly growing south-of-the-river suburbs of the city of Perth.  1,731 students from Years 7 to 12 attended the school.

In 2009 the WA Government allocated $56 million for the re-development of the school. A competitive tender process was completed in April 2010. The original school 'H' block, science block, swimming pool, and the 1970s gymnasium was retained. All other existing buildings were removed. A new south wing on the site of the existing tennis courts was designed to house a new administration area, library, resource centre, science, home economics and health and physical education wings. A new design, and technology centre was constructed to the east of the swimming pool and a new visual arts centre was located on the site of existing basketball courts. The gymnasium was converted into a performing arts centre, while the original 'H' block was refurbished for use by business/information technology, careers & vocational education, English, languages, mathematics, society & environment and student services.

School crest
The school crest is a combination of a black swan holding a book, signifying proximity to the Swan River, with a hand holding a scimitar, emerging from a five-pointed crown ("issuant from an eastern crown or, a dexter hand holding a scimitar, in fess all proper"), the crest of the Chief of the Matheson clan. Sir Alexander Matheson Bt of Lochalsh, a property developer who in 1897 initiated the subdivision of the suburb of Applecross, became Chief of the Clan in 1920 on the death of his brother, the 2nd Baronet.

Academic ranking
The Year-12 cohort at Applecross perform consistently well in the WACE school rankings, and the school ranks well when compared to other schools in Western Australia.

WA school ATAR ranking

Year 12 student achievement data

Beazley Medals

 2014: Robert Rubery won the Beazley Medal for the top ranked Vocational Education & Training (VET) student.
 1993: Bertrand Sze Yu Lee won the Beazley Medal for the top ranked TEE student.

Notable alumni

 Dean AlstonWalkley Award winning newspaper cartoonist
 Tony Ayresfilm director
 Marcus BeilbyRealist painter, winner of Sir John Sulman Prize
 Darren Bennettformer Australian Rules football player and American football punter in the NFL
Jenny Boult (1951-2005)author and poet, won 1981 Anne Elder Award for first book of poetry
 Jim Gill Chancellor of Curtin University, Western Australia (2010-2012), former: CEO of WA Water Corporation; WA Commissioner of Railways
Jillian Green artist whose work is held in many major Western Australian institutions
 Jeanette Hacket Vice-Chancellor of Curtin University, Western Australia (2006-2013)
 Adele Horin (1951-2015)Walkley Award-winning columnist and reporter for The Sydney Morning Herald, previously international correspondent for the National Times.
 Toby Hussey  Journalist and newsreader
 Peter Lewis former Australian Consul-General and Senior Trade Commissioner in San Francisco
 Bill LoudenDeputy Vice-Chancellor (2009-2013) and Dean of Education (2006-2008) of University of Western Australia
 Vince Lovegrove (1947-2012)journalist, music manager, television producer, musician
 Raoul Marksdual Emmy Award winner for main title design on True Detective and The Man in the High Castle 
 Tonya McCuskerclassical dancer, wife of Governor of Western Australia
 Vinay MenonRhodes Scholar 2012, John Monash Scholar
 Steve Pennellsjournalist, 5-time Walkley Award winner including Gold Walkley in 2012, 18 WA Media Awards
 Graeme RobertsonRhodes Scholar 1971, former: Director of Muresk Institute of Curtin University; Director-General of WA Department of Agriculture
 Diane Stoneprofessor in Politics and International Studies at the University of Warwick, UK and Professor in Public Policy at Central European University in Budapest.
 Lesley VidovichWinthrop Professor, Graduate School of Education, University of Western Australia
 Reece WaldockDirector General of WA Department of Transport, Commissioner for Main Roads, CEO of Public Transport Authority of Western Australia. Former WA Commissioner of Railways
 Steve Wardboat builder; built 1983 12-metre class America's Cup winner Australia II, and challengers Australia, Australia III, Australia IV, Challenger 12 & South Australia.
 Bruce WilliamsCommissioner of Fair Work Australia, former Commissioner of the Australian Industrial Relations Commission, Perth

See also

 List of schools in the Perth metropolitan area

References

External links
Applecross Senior High School Website

Educational institutions established in 1958
Public high schools in Perth, Western Australia
1958 establishments in Australia